Töcksfors is a locality situated in Årjäng Municipality, Värmland County, Sweden with 1,247 inhabitants in 2018.

References 

Populated places in Värmland County
Populated places in Årjäng Municipality